Semmelberg is a hill of Brandenburg, Germany.

Hills of Brandenburg